Hong Kong Link 2004 Limited is a company wholly owned by the Government of Hong Kong created to securitise revenue from five government-owned toll tunnels and the Lantau Link. The HK$6 billion securitisation was launched in April 2004. 

The Chinese name of Hong Kong Link literally means "five tunnels and one bridge", for the facilities it comprises, namely:

 Aberdeen Tunnel
 Cross-Harbour Tunnel
 Lion Rock Tunnel
 Shing Mun Tunnels
 Tseung Kwan O Tunnel
 Lantau Link (including Tsing Ma Bridge)

See also
 Transport in Hong Kong

References

External links
 Official homepage

Transport companies of Hong Kong
Government-owned companies of Hong Kong
Chinese companies established in 2004
Transport companies established in 2004